Yoshiyuki Ogata (緒方 良行 Ogata Yoshiyuki, born February 4, 1998) is a Japanese professional sport climber and boulderer. He has won multiple medals in bouldering at IFSC Climbing World Cup events, including gold medals at Vail in 2019 and at Innsbruck in 2021. Ogata won the overall IFSC Men's Bouldering title for the 2021 and 2022 seasons and finished third overall in 2019.

Early life and youth competitions
Born in Kurume, Fukuoka prefecture, Ogata began bouldering at age 10 after he saw the sport on television. At age 17, he won the lead competition at the 2015 Japan Youth National Championships, as well as the bouldering competitions at the IFSC Climbing World Youth Championships and the IFSC Climbing Asian Youth Championships in the Male Youth A (age 15-17) category. He won another bouldering gold medal as well as a combined silver medal at the World Youth Championships in 2017 in the Male Junior (age 17 to 19) category.

Senior competitions
Ogata began competing in senior competitions at age 16, entering the Chongqing and Laval World Cups in 2014. At age 18, he won the gold medal in men's bouldering event at the 2016 IFSC Climbing Asian Championships, and collected a silver in bouldering and bronze in lead the following year. Ogata won gold at the men's bouldering event at the 2017 World Games, where he qualified as the 2016 Asian champion. He made his first World Cup podium finish with a bronze medal at the Vail World Cup in 2017,. Ogata won his first World Cup event in bouldering at Vail in 2019 and won his second at Innsbruck in 2021. At the 2021 IFSC Climbing World Championships, Ogata advanced to the men's final in lead, finishing 7th overall. In 2022, Ogata made the finals in all six IFSC World Cup bouldering events, taking home one gold, two silver, and two bronze medals, and winning the overall title.

Climbing World Championships 
Youth

Adult

World Cup podiums

Bouldering

See also
List of grade milestones in rock climbing
History of rock climbing
Rankings of most career IFSC gold medals

References

External links

 JMSCA profile  

Living people
1998 births
Japanese rock climbers
Sportspeople from Fukuoka Prefecture
People from Kurume
Japanese sportsmen
Competitors at the 2017 World Games
Competitors at the 2022 World Games
World Games bronze medalists
20th-century Japanese people
21st-century Japanese people
IFSC Climbing World Cup overall medalists
Boulder climbers